Tomislav Brkić and Ante Pavić were the defending champions but chose not to defend their title.

Vitaliy Sachko and Dominic Stricker won the title after defeating Tomás Martín Etcheverry and Renzo Olivo 6–3, 5–7, [10–8] in the final.

Seeds

Draw

References

External links
 Main draw

Internazionali di Tennis Città di Perugia - Doubles
2021 Doubles